Linguliformea is a subphylum of inarticulate brachiopods. These were the earliest of brachiopods, ranging from the Cambrian into the Holocene. They rapidly diversified during the Cambrian into the Ordovician, but most families became extinct by the end of the Devonian.

The articulation in these brachiopods is lacking. These brachiopods have adductor and oblique muscles, but no diductor muscles. The anus is located at the side of the body. The pedicle is a hollow extension of the ventral body wall. Posterior body wall separates dorsal and ventral mantles.

The shells are usually made up of apatite (calcium phosphate), however rare cases have calcite or aragonite shells.

See also

References

Brachiopod taxonomy
Paleozoic brachiopods
Devonian extinctions
Animal subphyla